The Old Belleair Town Hall (also known as the Belleair Garden Club) is a historic site in Belleair, Florida. It is located at 903 Ponce de Leon Boulevard. On May 6, 1994, it was added to the U.S. National Register of Historic Places. The current Town Hall is located next door at 901 Ponce de Leon Boulevard.

References

External links
 Pinellas County listings at National Register of Historic Places
 Old Belleair Town Hall at Florida's Office of Cultural and Historical Programs

City and town halls in Florida
National Register of Historic Places in Pinellas County, Florida
City and town halls on the National Register of Historic Places in Florida